Stuart Ramsay is a British journalist who is currently Sky News’ Chief Correspondent. He is Sky's longest serving foreign correspondent.

He graduated from the University of East Anglia in 1985. He received an Honorary Doctorate of Civil Law from his alma mater in 2018.

He has won two Emmy Awards, received four BAFTA nominations, a Monte Carlo Film Award Golden Nymph, London Press Club's Journalist of the Year and three Royal Television Society awards.

Activities

During the Battle of Mosul, Ramsay was directly next to an ISIL VBIED which exploded while he and his cameraman were recording footage from an Iraqi drone dropping grenades onto ISIL positions. They were unharmed, however upwards of 20-30 Iraqi soldiers may have been killed, as well as multiple vehicles including a Humvee and a main battle tank being destroyed.

In March 2020, he was the first TV journalist to report from inside a hospital hard hit by Italy's coronavirus pandemic, conducting his video tour of a badly overcrowded hospital while wearing a full-body hazmat suit. The news report won the British Journalism Awards 2020 for best "Foreign Journalism"; the judges said Ramsay’s coverage of the coronavirus outbreak in Italy was “a very brave piece of reporting which will have changed a lot of peoples’ thinking” and “the story that brought the impact of coronavirus close to home”. They said his “storytelling was fantastic” and his reports “whacked the audience between the eyes and woke Britain up to how serious this pandemic was”.

In August 2021 he reported from the Afghan capital during the Fall of Kabul.

On 28 February 2022 he was shot and wounded while reporting near Kyiv during the Russian invasion of Ukraine.

References

Year of birth missing (living people)
Living people
Alumni of the University of East Anglia
Sky News newsreaders and journalists